The 2022–23 UEFA Futsal Champions League is the 37th edition of Europe's premier club futsal tournament, and the 22nd edition organized by UEFA. It is also the fifth edition since the tournament was rebranded from "UEFA Futsal Cup" to UEFA Futsal Champions League.

Barcelona are the title holders.

Association team allocation
A total of 56 teams from 52 of the 55 UEFA member associations participated in the 2022–23 UEFA Futsal Champions League. The association ranking based on the UEFA futsal national team coefficients was used to determine the number of participating teams for each association:
The top three-ranked associations have two teams qualify.
The winners of the 2021–22 UEFA Futsal Champions League qualify automatically and its association can also enter a second team. If the title-holders' association is among the top three-ranked associations, the 4th ranked association is also entitled to enter a second team.
The remaining associations have one team qualify.

For this season, the top three-ranked associations are Portugal, Russia, and Spain. As the title holders are from Spain, the 4th ranked association, Kazakhstan, can enter two teams. After UEFA's decision to exclude Russian clubs from the 2022–23 UEFA competitions due to the 2022 Russian invasion of Ukraine, the right to enter a second team passed to the 5th ranked association, Croatia.

Association ranking
The UEFA futsal national team coefficients at the end of April 2022, used to determine the number of teams each association was entitled to enter, was as follows.

Notes
TH – Additional berth for title holders
NR – No rank (association national team had been inactive on the previous 36 months)
DNE – Did not enter

Distribution
For the 2022–23 UEFA Futsal Champions League, the clubs' entry round was determined by their UEFA futsal club coefficients, which took into account their performance from the previous three seasons.

Teams
Below are the participating teams of the 2022–23 UEFA Futsal Champions League (with their ranking among participating teams), grouped by their starting round and path for the main round.

Format
The tournament has a mini-tournament format consisting of three qualifying rounds and the final tournament. The qualifying rounds consisted of the following stages:
Preliminary round: 32 teams entering this round were divided into eight groups of four teams with the group winners advancing to the next round.
Main round:
Path A: 16 teams entering this round were divided into four groups of four teams, with the group winners, runners-up, and third-placed teams advancing to the next round.
Path B: 8 teams that entered in this round and the 8 teams advancing from the preliminary round were divided into four groups of four teams, with the group winners advancing to the next round.
Elite round: 16 teams advancing from the main round were divided into four groups of four teams, with the group winners qualifying for the final tournament.
In each group, teams played against each other in a single round-robin format hosted by one of the participating teams.

The final tournament is played at a centralized location and consisted of single-legged semi-finals, a third-place play-off, and final. If scores were level at the end of normal time, extra time was played, followed by a penalty shoot-out if the scores remained tied.

Tiebreakers
Teams were ranked according to points (3 points for a win, 1 point for a draw, 0 points for a loss). If two or more teams were tied on points, the following tiebreaking criteria were applied, in the order given, to determine the rankings (see Article 14 Equality of points – mini-tournaments, Regulations of the UEFA Futsal Champions League):
Points in head-to-head matches among the tied teams;
Goal difference in head-to-head matches among the tied teams;
Goals scored in head-to-head matches among the tied teams;
If more than two teams were tied, and after applying all head-to-head criteria above, a subset of teams are still tied, all head-to-head criteria above were reapplied exclusively to this subset of teams;
Goal difference in all group matches;
Goals scored in all group matches;
Disciplinary points (direct red card = 3 points; double yellow card = 3 points; single yellow card = 1 point);
UEFA futsal club coefficients.

If two teams that have the same number of points and have scored and conceded the same number of goals play their last mini-tournament match against each other and are still equal at the end of that match, their final rankings are determined by a penalty shoot-out provided that no other teams within the group have the same number of points on completion of the mini-tournament. This procedure is only necessary if a ranking of the teams is required to determine the team which qualifies for the next stage.

Schedule
The schedule of the competition was as follows (all draws were held at the UEFA headquarters in Nyon, Switzerland).

Preliminary round
The draw for the preliminary round was held on 7 July 2022, 14:30 CEST. The preliminary round was played from 24 to 28 August 2022. The winners of each group advanced to the main round Path B.

Times are CEST, as listed by UEFA (local times, if different, are in parentheses).

Seeding
A total of 32 teams played in the preliminary round. Seeding of teams was based on their 2022 UEFA futsal club coefficients. Eight teams were pre-selected as hosts and were first drawn from a separate pot to their corresponding seeding position. The remaining teams were then drawn from their respective pots to their corresponding seeding position.

Notes
H – Mini-tournament hosts

Group A

Group B

Group C

Group D

Group E

Group F

Group G

Group H

Main round
The draw for the main round was held on 7 July 2022, 14:30 CEST.The main round was played from 25 to 30 October 2022.

Times until October 29 are CEST, then CET, as listed by UEFA (local times, if different, are in parentheses).

Seeding
A total of 32 teams played in the main round. They were divided in two paths:
Path A (16 teams): the title holders and teams ranked 1–11 and 16–19.
Path B (16 teams): teams ranked 12–15 and 20–23 and 8 teams advancing from the preliminary round.

Seeding of teams was based on their 2022 UEFA futsal club coefficients. On Path B, the seeding position 3 and 4 were drawn from the same pot, comprising all teams advancing from the preliminary round. Eight teams (four in each path) were pre-selected as hosts and were first drawn from a separate pot to their corresponding seeding position. The remaining teams were then drawn from their respective pots to their corresponding seeding position. Teams from Kosovo and Serbia, Kosovo and Bosnia and Herzegovina or Armenia and Azerbaijan could not be drawn into the same group.

Notes
H – Mini-tournament hosts

Path A
The top three teams of each group in Path A advanced to the elite round.

Group 1

Group 2

Group 3

Group 4

Path B
The winners of each group in Path B advanced to the elite round.

Group 5

Group 6

Group 7

Group 8

Elite round
The draw for the elite round was held on 3 November 2022, 14:15 CET. The elite round was played from 22 to 26 November 2022.

Times are CET, as listed by UEFA (local times, if different, are in parentheses).

Seeding
A total of 16 teams played in the elite round. Seeding of teams was based on their results in the previous round:
Seeding position 1: main round path A group winners.
Seeding position 2: main round path A runners-up.
Seeding positions 3 and 4 (drawn from the same pot): main round path A third-placed teams and path B group winners.
Four teams were pre-selected as hosts and were first drawn from a separate pot to their corresponding seeding position. Winners and runners-up from the same main round path A group could not be drawn into the same group.

Notes
H – Mini-tournament hosts

Group A

Group B

Group C

Group D

Final tournament
The final tournament consisted of two semifinals, a third-place play-off and a final, and was contested by the last four remaining teams from 5 May to 7 May at the Palma de Mallorca in Spain.

 Sporting CP
 Palma Futsal
 Benfica
 Anderlecht

Bracket

Statistics

Top goalscorers
Preliminary round: There were 419 goals scored in 48 matches, for an average of 8.73 goals per match.
Main round: 
Elite round: 
Final tournament:

Top assists

References

External links

2022–23
August 2022 sports events in Europe
October 2022 sports events in Europe
November 2022 sports events in Europe
Sports events affected by the 2022 Russian invasion of Ukraine
UEFA Futsal